Indra Manikya II (d. 1746) was the Maharaja of Tripura during the mid-18th-century. His reign was spent struggling for control of the kingdom with his relative Joy Manikya II.

Life
Originally named Panch Cowrie Thakur, he was one of the sons of Maharaja Mukunda Manikya by his wife Prabhavati. During his father's reign, he was sent to the Mughal court of Murshidabad as a hostage.

In 1739, after having been arrested by the Mughals on the grounds of neglecting to pay his tribute of elephants, Mukunda committed suicide. His cousin Joy Manikya was chosen by the populace as his successor over Mukunda's sons after the former drove the Mughals out of Udaipur. Panch Cowrie, who developed a grudge against Joy, approached Alivardi Khan, the Nawab of Bengal, for aid in claiming Tripura in 1744. With his military support, he overthrew Joy and took the throne, assuming the reginal name Indra Manikya.

However, Indra was unable to rule peacefully, as Joy ran a parallel government from the Matia Hills and had the support of influential Zamindars. The latter monarch made repeated attempts to regain full power, though was always prevented by Mughal forces. The kingdom remained divided between the partisans of the rival rulers for a time, until Indra was ousted after Joy gained the support of the Mughals. However, Indra was later once again returned to the throne by the Nawab of Dhaka after Joy failed to provide tribute.

This restoration proved short, as by 1746, Indra had again lost the favour of the Nawab and a large army was dispatched against him. He was compelled to submit and was sent to Murshidabad, where he subsequently died. Joy, who had again retaken the throne, also died around this time.

References

Kings of Tripura
History of Tripura
Dethroned monarchs
1746 deaths